Surry Hills was an electoral district of the Legislative Assembly in the Australian state of New South Wales, named after and including Surry Hills and was originally created in the 1904 re-distribution of electorates following the 1903 New South Wales referendum, which required the number of members of the Legislative Assembly to be reduced from 125 to 90. It consisted of part of the abolished seat of Sydney-Flinders and parts of Sydney-Cook and Randwick. In 1920, with the introduction of proportional representation, it was absorbed into Sydney. It was recreated in 1927 and abolished in 1930.

Members for Surry Hills

Election results

References

Former electoral districts of New South Wales
Constituencies established in 1904
1904 establishments in Australia
Constituencies disestablished in 1920
1920 disestablishments in Australia
Constituencies established in 1927
1927 establishments in Australia
Constituencies disestablished in 1930
1930 disestablishments in Australia